The Parthian Stone is a relief located in the ancient site of Bisotun in Kermanshah Province, Iran, a UNESCO world heritage site. It shows a Parthian king with a bowl in his left hand. It also has an inscription, which identities the king as Vologases. Six kings named Vologases are known to have ruled the Parthian Empire, from 51 to the 220s CE. The inscription may refer to Vologases I or Vologases III. This historical heritage was listed in Iranian national heritages on 10 March 2002.

The inscription, written in nine lines on the surface of the altar, uses the Aramaic script to transcribe the Parthian language logographically, and reads:

Vologases is seen frontally, holding a bowl and sacrificing at an altar, and is flanked by two attendants carved on the sides of the rock.

References

Sources 
 
 

National works of Iran
Tourist attractions in Kermanshah Province
Parthian rock reliefs